Matthew Stephens (born 4 January 1970) is a British former professional road racing cyclist, who rode as a professional between 1998 and 2011.

Biography
As a junior rider, Stephens won the Junior Tour of Wales in both 1987 and 1988, one of only two riders to win the race twice. He represented Great Britain at the 1992 Summer Olympics in Barcelona, finishing 61st in the road race. Stephens finished 8th in the Amateur World Road Race Championships in 1995, forming part of a break on the second lap of the race alongside eventual winner Danny Nelissen and earning Team GB their squad for the Atlanta Olympics in 1996 (automatic qualification for the Games was restricted to nations with finishers in the top 15 of the 1995 World Championships). However, he was not selected for the Olympic Road Race team that year. He became the British National Road Race Champion in 1998. After this he turned professional with the British-based Harrods team in 1998, before riding for the Linda McCartney Racing Team in 1999 until their demise in February 2001. During the 2000 3-week Giro d'Italia race he battled through with injuries from a fall, earning media admiration. He rode for Sigma Sport between 2001 and 2011, acting as rider/manager from 2010 onwards. He combined his racing at Sigma Sport with a career in the police with Cheshire Constabulary, which he joined in 2001. A broken knee in the 2011 Paris-Troyes ended his racing career.

Since retiring from racing, he has written for various websites as well as being the 'specialist' on ITV4's Halfords Tour Series and Tour of Britain coverage, and commentating on live races for British Cycling's Premier Calendar and Eurosport. He also worked as a presenter for Global Cycling Network, a YouTube channel backed by Shift Active Media. On 24 April 2018, he announced on the weekly Global Cycling Network (GCN) show that he would leave GCN, shifting his focus to race commentary work and live events. Since 2018, he has presented "Matt Stephens Cafe Ride" for the Sigma Sports Youtube Channel. During these episodes he interviews a figure from the world of cycling during a cycle ride and "cafe stop"

Major results

1987
 1st  Overall Junior Tour of Wales
1988
 1st  Overall Junior Tour of Wales
 1st Overall National Junior Road Series 
1989
 1st Hessen Rundfahrt
1993
 1st Overall Tour of the Peak
1994
 3rd National Amateur Criterium Championships
1995
 1st Tom Simpson Memorial
 3rd Rás Tailteann
 7th Road race, UCI Road World Amateur Championships
1997
 3rd Road race, National Road Championships

1998
 1st  Road race, National Road Championships
 2nd Havant International GP
 3rd Overall Tour of Greece
1999
 1st Tom Simpson Memorial
 4th Road race, National Road Championships
2000
 2nd Overall Tour of the Cotswolds
 4th Overall Tour de Langkawi
 4th Road race, National Road Championships
 8th Overall Tour Down Under
 Giro d'Italia (Withdrew) 
2001
 1st Manx Trophy
 3rd Lincoln International GP
 3rd Tour of the Peak
2002
 2nd Neil Gardner Memorial
2003
 3rd Havant International GP
 1st Overall Tour of Northumberland
3rd Stage 2
2006
 1st Worcester St Johns RR
 3rd Overall Tour of the Reservoir
 3rd Rydale GP
2007
 3rd East Yorkshire Classic Roadrace
2008
 4th Grand Prix of Wales
2009
 7th Rutland–Melton International CiCLE Classic
2010
 2nd Dumfries Bike Fest Grand 
 9th East Yorkshire Classic

Grand Tour general classification results timeline

References

External links

"Matt Stephens Cafe Ride" at Sigma Sports Youtube

1970 births
Living people
British male cyclists
English male cyclists
Cyclists at the 1992 Summer Olympics
Olympic cyclists of Great Britain
British cycling road race champions
People from Edgware
Cycling announcers